Fountain Inn may refer to:
 Fountain Inn, South Carolina,  a town in  Greenville and Laurens Counties, South Carolina, United States
 Fountain Inn, Ashurst, a 16th-century public house in West Sussex, England
 Fountain Inn (novel), a 1939 mystery novel by Victor Canning